Dactylioglypha is a genus of moths belonging to the subfamily Olethreutinae of the family Tortricidae.

Species
Dactylioglypha avita Diakonoff, 1973
Dactylioglypha mimas Diakonoff, 1973
Dactylioglypha pallens Diakonoff, 1973
Dactylioglypha tonica (Meyrick, 1909)
Dactylioglypha zonata Diakonoff, 1973

See also
List of Tortricidae genera

References

External links
tortricidae.com

Olethreutini
Tortricidae genera
Taxa named by Alexey Diakonoff